Time Tells No Lies is the debut album by British heavy metal band Praying Mantis.

Release 
Time Tells No Lies was released in 1981 after the band signed a worldwide deal with Arista Records following the Reading Rock '80 festival. Some copies came with a one sided A4 merchandise insert. It peaked at number 60 on the UK Albums Chart in April 1981.

Cover art 
The original cover is by  Rodney Matthews.

Track listing

Personnel 
Band
 Tino Troy – guitars, vocals
 Steve Carroll – guitars, vocals
 Chris Troy – bass guitar, vocals
 Dave Potts – drums, all percussion

Production

 Mike Shipley – engineering
 Freddy Silva – photography
 Ben Challis – business affairs

Charts

Album

Singles
Cheated

|}

References 

1981 debut albums
Praying Mantis (band) albums
Arista Records albums